Kabina is a village in Luunja Parish, Tartu County in eastern Estonia.

The first Estonian Children Song Festival took place in Kabina on 2 June 1870.

References

Villages in Tartu County